Stade Toulousain, also referred to as Toulouse, is a professional rugby union club based in Toulouse, France. They compete in the Top 14, France's top division of rugby, and the European Rugby Champions Cup. 

Toulouse is the most successful club in Europe, having won the Heineken Cup/European Rugby Champions Cup a record five times – in 1996, 2003, 2005, 2010 and 2021. They were also runners-up in 2004 and 2008 against London Wasps and Munster, respectively. Stade Toulousain have also won a record 21 Boucliers de Brennus, the French domestic league trophy. It is traditionally one of the main providers for the French national team and its youth academy is one of the best in the world.  

Their home ground is the Stade Ernest-Wallon. However, big Top 14 matches along with European games are often played at the Stadium Municipal de Toulouse. The club colours are red, black and white.

History

Roots and foundation

Before 1907, rugby union in Toulouse was only played in schools or universities. In 1893, students of secondary school "Lycée de Toulouse" got together in a new team "Les Sans Soucis". Once attending university, the same students founded "l'Olympique Toulousain", which became "Stade Olympien des Etudiants de Toulouse" (SOET) a few years later in 1896. In the same period, 'non-students' grouped in "le Sport Athlétique Toulousain" (SAT) while students of the veterinary school created "l'Union Sportive de l'Ecole Vétérinaire" (USEV). Both entities merged in 1905 and called themselves "Véto-Sport". Finally in 1907, Stade Toulousain was founded resulting from a union between the SOET and Véto-Sport.

Since its creation in 1907, Stade Toulousain drew on the past of the city. The design of Stade Toulousain's crest refers to the initials of Thomas Aquinas ( in French ; S and T, same as the club's name) whose bones rest in the Church of the Jacobins, in Toulouse. The interlaced letters came from a famous tiled floor of the Basilica of Saint-Sernin, where the relics were temporarily moved for almost two centuries after the French Revolution. The historical colours, red and black, are rooted in the ceremonial costume of the capitouls of Toulouse. A municipal body created in 1147, the capitouls were until the French Revolution the consuls of the city. Their traditional costume was red and black (with white bands), as shown in the oldest portraits dating from the 14th century.

Early years

Stade Toulousain played its first final of the national title French Championship in 1909 and lost it to Stade Bordelais Université Club (17–0) in Toulouse. In 1912 Stade Toulousain won its first national title. It had to wait until 1922 before it won its second. However the 1920s were a golden era for the club. Their first final action in the 1920s was in 1921, when they were defeated by USA Perpignan. Despite losing in 1921, the side went on to win the 1922, 1923, 1924, 1926 and 1927 championships.

1930s to 1950s
The following decades were relatively quiet after such a dominant era during the 1920s. Stade Toulousain would not make it to any grand finals during the 1930s, and it would not be until the late 1940s when they would return. However they did contest the Challenge Yves du Manoir with RC Toulon in 1934, though it ended in a nil-all tie and both teams were winners. The club made it to the final of the 1947 championship, and claimed the premiership, beating SU Agen, 10 to 3. However, no such championships followed, the club was again relatively quiet on the championship. It was 22 years in the waiting; Toulouse made it to the final, but were defeated by the CA Bègles club.

1970s to 1980s
In 1971 Toulouse contested the Challenge Yves du Manoir against US Dax, losing 18 to 8. Eleven years after the CA Bègles defeat, the club was again disappointed in the final, being defeated by AS Béziers in the championship game of 1980. The latter end of the decade was however, reminiscent of the 1920s sides. Toulouse were again contesting the Challenge Yves du Manoir for the 1984 season, though they lost to RC Narbonne 17 to 3. They did however claim their first championship since 1947, defeating RC Toulon in the 1985 final. The following season saw them successfully defend their championship, defeating SU Agen in the final. After a number of defeats in the Challenge Yves du Manoir finals, Toulouse defeated US Dax to win the 1988 competition. Both Toulon and Agen won the following premierships (1987 and 1988) but Toulouse won another championship in 1989.

1990s to present
The dominance continued in the 1990s, starting with a grand final loss in 1991, and a Challenge Yves du Manoir championship in 1993, defeating Castres 13 to 8 in the final. The mid-1990s saw Stade Toulousain become a major force yet again, as the club claimed four premierships in a row, winning the championship in 1994, 1995, 1996 and 1997, as well as the Challenge Yves du Manoir in 1995. The club emulated its success in the European Rugby Cup, becoming the first ever champions in the 1995–96 season.

The late 1990s and the 2000s saw the club again reach great heights. The club won the Challenge Yves du Manoir in 1998, defeating Stade Français Paris, the 1999 championship as well as the 2001 championship. They also were runners-up in the 2003 season, losing to Stade Français in the final. As the club had done in the mid-1990s, Stade Toulousain replicated this success in the European Rugby Cup, winning the 2002–03 and the 2004–05 cups. The club made it to the final of the 2005-06 Top 14, and despite only trailing Biarritz 9–6 at half time, Toulouse could not prevent a second-half whitewash, eventually going down 40–13. They ended their seven-year title drought with a 26–20 win over ASM Clermont Auvergne on 28 June 2008.  In 2008 they narrowly lost a Heineken Cup Final to Munster by 3 points. In 2010 Toulouse defeated Leinster to reach the final where they faced Biarritz Olympique at Stade de France in Paris on Saturday 22 May 2010. Toulouse won the game by 21–19 to claim their fourth Heineken Cup title, making them the first club to win the title four times.  Stade Toulousain is also the only French club to have taken part in all the editions of Heineken Cup since its creation (17, with the 2011–12 season).  They won the French championship in 2011 against Montpellier (15–10) and 2012 against Toulon (18–12). Stade Toulousain reached the semi-finals of the French championship 20 consecutive years (from 1994 to 2013). In 2019, Toulouse came back to victory, earning a 20th French Rugby Union Championship title before making an historic double, winning the 2021 Champions Cup and the 2021 Top 14.

Stadium

Toulouse play their home games at the Stade Ernest-Wallon, which was built in the late 1980s and was recently renovated.  It has a capacity of 19,500. Stade Toulousain is one of the rare teams, in France and especially in rugby union, that own its stadium. Since February 2020, it has also been home to rugby league team Toulouse Olympique, which currently competes in the Super League, following negotiations and an agreement between both executive boards. 

The stadium however cannot always accommodate all the fans of the Toulouse club. For the larger fixtures, such as championship or Heineken Cup games or play-offs, the fixture may be moved to Stadium Municipal, which has more capacity, 33,150. The stadium was used for numerous matches at the 2007 Rugby World Cup and will host the 2023 Rugby World Cup.

Honours

 Heineken Cup/European Rugby Champions Cup
 Champions (5): 1996, 2003, 2005, 2010, 2021
 Runners-up: 2004, 2008
French Champions:
 Champions (21): 1912, 1922, 1923, 1924, 1926, 1927, 1947, 1985, 1986, 1989, 1994, 1995, 1996, 1997, 1999, 2001, 2008, 2011, 2012, 2019, 2021
 Runners-up: 1903, 1909, 1921, 1969, 1980, 1991, 2003, 2006
 Challenge Yves du Manoir:
 Champions (4): 1934, 1988, 1993, 1995
 Runners-up: 1971, 1984
 French Cup:
 Champions (4): 1946, 1947, 1984, 1998
 Runners-up: 1949, 1985
Toulouse Masters:
 Champions (2): 1986, 1990

European record

Toulouse qualified for the Heineken Cup in every season of that competition's existence (1995–96 to 2013–14), and played in the inaugural season of the replacement competition, the European Rugby Champions Cup. 

The club have the best competition record in the Heineken Cup/European Rugby Champions Cup, having won the competition five times and having played seven finals, and was the first team to win over 100 games in the history of the competition. Along with Munster, Toulouse is the most victorious team in the history of the competition, with a total of 124 wins. It's the second best club in European rugby in terms of total games played in the highest European competition possible with 179 games alongside Leinster and behind Munster.    

Stade toulousain completed "the Double" (Heineken Cup/European Rugby Champions Cup-National Championship) 2 times (1995-1996 and 2020-2021), a record shared with Leicester Tigers (2000-2001 and 2001-2002) and Saracens (2015-2016 and 2018-2019). 

Vincent Clerc is the second all-time top try scorer in Heineken Cup/European Rugby Champions Cup history, having scored 36 units.

Current standings

Selected presidents

 Ernest Wallon: 1907–12
 Charles Audry: 1912–30
 Louis Puech: 1944–51
 Jean Fabre: 1980–90
 René Bouscatel: 1992–2017
 Didier Lacroix: 2017-

Bouscatel is the most successful president in the history of the club.

Selected former coaches

 Tom "Rusty" Richards: 1913 (as player/manager)
 François Borde: 1928-30, 1934-38
 Roger Piteu: 1945-49
 Claude Labatut: 1971-76, 1976-80
 Robert Bru: 1980-83
 Pierre Villepreux: 1982-89 (coached along with Skrela between 1983 and 1989)
 Jean-Claude Skrela: 1983-92 (coached along with Villepreux between 1983 and 1989)
 Guy Novès: 1988-90 (as assistant coach), 1993-2015
 Ugo Mola: 2015-

Current squad

The Toulouse squad for the 2022–23 season is:

Espoirs squad

Out on loan

Notable former players

The following are players who have represented their country, players who have won a title with the club, players who have played a sufficient number of games to go down in the club history or players who came from the academy and have made a significant career in another team:

 
  Patricio Albacete
  Omar Hasan
  Nicolás Vergallo
  Alberto Vernet Basualdo
  Rory Arnold
  Luke Burgess
  Tala Gray
  Tom Richards
  Rob Andrew
  Toby Flood
  Rupeni Caucaunibuca
  Vilimoni Delasau
  Semi Kunatani
  Maleli Kunavore
  Timoci Matanavou
  Akapusi Qera
  David Aucagne
  Benoît Baby
  Jean Bayard
  Lionel Beauxis
  Franck Belot
  Nicolas Bézy
  Sébastien Bézy
  Alexandre Bioussa
  Jean-Marie Bonal
  Eric Bonneval
  Jean Bouilhou
  François Borde
  Guillaume Boussès
  Yannick Bru
  Jean-Marie Cadieu
  Christian Califano
  Yacouba Camara
  Philippe Carbonneau
  Thomas Castaignède
  Richard Castel
  Jérôme Cazalbou
  Denis Charvet
  André Chilo
  Albert Cigagna
  Vincent Clerc
  Didier Codorniou
  Patrice Collazo
  Cédric Desbrosse
  Yann Delaigue
  Yann David
  Christophe Deylaud
  Yves Donguy
  Jean-Marc Doussain
  Sylvain Dupuy
  Thierry Dusautoir
  Jean-Baptiste Élissalde
  Jean Fabre
  Gaël Fickou
  Jérôme Fillol
  Florian Fritz
  Gillian Galan
  Henri Galau
  Xavier Garbajosa
  David Gérard
  Imanol Harinordoquy
  Dominique Harize
  Cédric Heymans
  Yoann Huget
  Adolphe Jauréguy
  Yannick Jauzion
  Nicolas Jeanjean
  Christian Labit
  Virgile Lacombe
  Serge Lairle
  Gregory Lamboley
  Benoît Lecouls
  Julien Le Devedec
  Matthieu Lièvremont
  Marcel-Frédéric Lubin-Lebrère
  Yoann Maestri
  Gérald Martinez
  Alfred Mayssonnié
  Maxime Médard
  Maxime Mermoz
  Frédéric Michalak
  Romain Millo-Chluski
  Hugues Miorin
  Ugo Mola
  Sylvain Nicolas
  Guy Novès
  Émile Ntamack
  Yannick Nyanga
  Alexis Palisson
  Fabien Pelous
  Alain Penaud
  Louis Picamoles
  Lucas Pointud
  Clément Poitrenaud
  Jean-Baptiste Poux
  Jean-Pierre Rives
  Philippe Rougé-Thomas
  Daniel Santamans
  William Servat
  David Skrela
  Jean-Claude Skrela
  Cédric Soulette
  Nicolas Spanghero
  Walter Spanghero
  Christopher Tolofua
  Franck Tournaire
  Pierre Villepreux
  Jaba Bregvadze
  Vasil Kakovin
  Andrea Lo Cicero
  Salvatore Perugini
  Trevor Brennan
  Aidan McCullen
  Corey Flynn
  Hosea Gear
  Jerome Kaino
  Byron Kelleher
  Isitolo Maka
  Luke McAlister
  Lee Stensness
  Neemia Tialata
  Dragoș Dima
  Gaffie du Toit
  Gary Botha
  Daan Human
  Cheslin Kolbe
  Shaun Sowerby
  Jano Vermaak
  Gurthrö Steenkamp
  Piula Faʻasalele
  Census Johnston
  Joe Tekori
  Richie Gray
  Edwin Maka
  Finau Maka
  Stuart Krohn
  Gareth Thomas

Fans

Being one of the most popular teams in France, Toulouse has many fan clubs all over the country:

 Le Huit (fan club of Stade toulousain based in Toulouse)
 Le Huit Section Aveyron (branch based in Aveyron)
 Le Rouge et le Noir (formerly Les Ultras, the oldest fan club based in Toulouse).
 Le 16e homme (fan club of Stade toulousain based in Haute-Garonne)
 Le 16e homme Toulousains 2 Paris (branch based in Paris)
 L'amicale des Supporters (fan club of Stade toulousain based in Toulouse)
 Tolosa XV (fan club of Stade toulousain based in Haute-Garonne)
 Les Salopettes Rouges (fan club based in Tarn)

Toulouse supporters are known for being very active on social media. Stade Toulousain is the most followed rugby club on social media in the world, ahead Crusaders, Sharks, Toulon and Stormers. 

Stade Ernest-Wallon atmosphere is well known in France and Europe to be one of the best of club rugby. Toulouse can rely on a passionate city, having one of the best attendances in the league. The club's mascot, Ovalion, is a lion, animal which is the symbol of Peugeot, main sponsor of the club.

See also
 List of rugby union clubs in France
 Rugby union in France

References

External links
  Stade Toulousain Official website
 Data, Results etc on ITS Rugby

 
Toulouse
Rugby clubs established in 1907
Multi-sport clubs in France
Toulouse
1907 establishments in France
Sport in Toulouse